Erich Zander (11 April 1905 – 15 April 1991) was a German field hockey player who competed in the 1928 Summer Olympics and in the 1936 Summer Olympics. In 1928 he was a member of the German field hockey team, which won the bronze medal. He played all four matches as halfback. Eight years later he won the silver medal in the field hockey competition.

References
Erich Zander's profile at Sports Reference.com

External links
 

1905 births
1991 deaths
Field hockey players at the 1928 Summer Olympics
Field hockey players at the 1936 Summer Olympics
German male field hockey players
Olympic bronze medalists for Germany
Olympic field hockey players of Germany
Olympic silver medalists for Germany
Olympic medalists in field hockey
Medalists at the 1936 Summer Olympics
Medalists at the 1928 Summer Olympics
20th-century German people